Carbonic anhydride may refer to:
 Carbon dioxide, the acidic oxide of carbonic acid
 Dicarbonic acid, the monoanhydride of carbonic acid using two molecules
 1,3-Dioxetanedione, the dianhydride of carbonic acid using two molecules
 1,3,5-Trioxanetrione, the dianhydride of carbonic acid using three molecules